Morna Dam, also called as Gureghar dam, is an earthfill dam on local river near Patur, Satara district in the state of Maharashtra in India.

Specifications

Purpose
 Irrigation

See also
 Dams in Maharashtra
 List of reservoirs and dams in India

References

Dams in Satara district
Dams completed in 1999
1999 establishments in Maharashtra